Matthew "Matty" Marsh (born 21 April 1995) is an English professional rugby league footballer who plays as a  for the York Knights in the Championship. 

He has previously played for Hull Kingston Rovers in the Super League.

Background
Marsh was born in Kingston upon Hull, East Riding of Yorkshire, England. Marsh is a product of the Hull Kingston Rovers's Academy System.

Playing career

Hull Kingston Rovers (2015-18)
Marsh made his Hull Kingston Rovers' début in a Super League match on 30 June 2015, against the Salford Red Devils. In 2016, after his breakout season he was awarded with the 'Young Player of the Year Award' at Hull Kingston Rovers. After the club's disappointing campaign which saw them relegated to the Championship after a ten-year stay in the Super League (2007–2016), due to losing the 2016 Million Pound Game by Salford. Marsh missed almost the entire 2017 rugby league season due to an Anterior Cruciate Ligament injury, but he returned towards the back-end of the year to help Hull Kingston Rovers gain automatic promotion back to the Super League, at the first time of asking following relegation the season prior. It was revealed on 10 October 2018, that Marsh would be departing Hull Kingston Rovers following a restructure of the club's on field personnel.

York City Knights (dual-registration 2018)
In 2018, while on dual-registration from his parent-club Hull Kingston Rovers, Marsh played a pivotal role in helping the York City Knights finish top of the League 1 competition to become Champions, to also earn promotion to the Championship for the 2019 season.

York City Knights (2019–present)
It was revealed on 17 October 2018, that Marsh had signed a contract to play for York on a permanent basis ahead of the 2019 season. He fast established himself as one of York's key players in their 2019 Betfred Championship campaign, his excellent support play helping the team no end.

Dual-registration
In 2015, Marsh made appearances for both the Newcastle Thunder and the Coventry Bears on a dual-registration basis.

Honours

Club (Hull Kingston Rovers 2015–2018)
 2016: 'Young Player of the Year Award'

Club (York City Knights 2018)
 2018: League 1 - Championship

References

External links
Hull KR profile
SL profile

1995 births
Living people
English rugby league players
Hull Kingston Rovers players
Newcastle Thunder players
Rugby league five-eighths
Rugby league fullbacks
Rugby league halfbacks
Rugby league players from Kingston upon Hull
York City Knights players